Mohamed Temam or Mohamed Temmam (23 February 1915 Algiers – 15 July 1988 Algiers) was Algerian miniaturist painter and illuminator.

His miniature painting of the Kaaba in Mecca was featured on a commemorative stamp issued by Algeria in 1978.

Bibliography
 Peintres algériens,  textes d'Edmond Michelet et Mourad Bourboune, Musée des Arts décoratifs de Paris, Paris, 1964
 Mohammed Khadda, Éléments pour un art nouveau, SNED, Alger, 1972 (p. 49)
 Musées d'Algérie, l'Art Populaire et Contemporain, Collection Art et Culture, Ministère de L'Information et la Culture, SNED, Alger, 1973
 Mohammed Khadda, Feuillets épars liés, SNED, Alger, 1983
 Dalila Mahhamed-Orfali, Chefs d'œuvre du Musée national des beaux-arts d'Alger, Alger, 1999 (reproduction :  L'homme en bleu, n° 79).
 Mansour Abrous, Les artistes algériens, Dictionnaire biographique, 1917–1999, Alger, Casbah éditions, 2002 (p. 212–214)

References

External links 
 Mohamed Temam from Famille Decruy 

Miniature painting
1915 births
1988 deaths
20th-century Algerian painters
Algerian artists